The 1928 Open Championship was the 63rd Open Championship, held 9–11 May at Royal St George's Golf Club in Sandwich, England. Walter Hagen won the third of his four Open Championship titles, two strokes ahead of runner-up Gene Sarazen. It was his second triumph at Royal St George's, the site of his first Open win in 1922. It was the tenth of his eleven major titles; his second Open victory came in 1924 at Royal Liverpool.

For this year and the next, the Open was played earlier than usual, in early May, and Hagen won both. Qualifying was held on 7–8 May, Monday and Tuesday, with 18 holes at St George's and 18 holes at Prince's, and the top 100 and ties qualified. José Jurado led the qualifiers on 144, which included four Bradbeer brothers: James, Bob, Ernest, and Fred. The qualifying score was 162 and 113 players qualified.

Two-time defending champion Bobby Jones decided not to make the trip across the Atlantic this year, meaning all eyes were on other American stars. Two weeks prior, Walter Hagen played a match against Archie Compston and lost badly, 18 & 17. Realizing he needed practice, Hagen resolved to skip the parties for which he had become famous and concentrate on his game.

On Wednesday, Bill Mehlhorn opened with 71 to take the lead, with Sarazen a stroke behind. Mehlhorn had a poor 78 on the second day and José Jurado took over the lead on 145.«» Hagen and Sarazen were second on 148 with Mehlhorn and Archie Compston on 149. To make the cut, players would need to be within 14 strokes of the leader after 36 holes; it was at 159 and 52 players advanced.

On Friday morning, Hagen took the lead by a stroke from Jurado and Sarazen, two ahead of Compston. Hagen's 72 that afternoon gave him 292 and the victory, two shots ahead of Sarazen. Jurado had a disappointing 80 and dropped into a tie for sixth place. The prizes were presented by the Prince of Wales.

Six-time champion Harry Vardon, age 58, made his last cut in the Open Championship and tied for 47th. He qualified for the Open just once more, the following year.

Past champions in the field

Made the cut 

Source:

Missed the cut 

Source:

Did not advance past qualifying rounds (Monday & Tuesday):
J.H. Taylor (1894, 1895, 1900, 1909, 1913), 163.

Did not enter:
Bobby Jones (1926, 1927), Jock Hutchison (1921).

Round summaries

First round
Wednesday, 9 May 1928

Source:

Second round
Thursday, 10 May 1928

Source:

Third round
Friday, 11 May 1928 (morning)

Source:

Final round
Friday, 11 May 1928 (afternoon)

Source:

Amateurs: Perkins (307), Hezlet (309), Hope (312), R Hartley (316), Torrance (316), Evans (319)

References

External links
Royal St George's 1928 (Official site)

The Open Championship
Golf tournaments in England
Open Championship
Open Championship
Open Championship